Sabella is a surname of Sicilian origin, the origin is in Agrigento (Acragante) prominent city of Magna Grecia. and may refer to:

Alejandro Sabella (1954–2020), Argentine football player and manager
Ernie Sabella (born 1949), American actor
Michael Sabella (1911–1989), American caporegime of the Bonanno crime family
Salvatore Sabella (1891–1962), American mob boss in Philadelphia
Steve Sabella (born 1975), Palestinian artist

References